Christopher Anthony Allen (born 18 November 1972) is an English professional football coach and former player. He is the manager of  club North Leigh.

A former England under-21 international midfielder, he started his career at Oxford United in 1991, playing 181 games in five years, helping to send the club on their way back to the First Division in 1995–96 before he signed with Nottingham Forest for a £400,000 fee. He played 26 Premier League games for Forest, though played little part in the club's 1997–98 First Division promotion campaign. Instead he was loaned out to Luton Town and Third Division promotion winners Cardiff City, before he was allowed to sign with Port Vale in March 1999. His career diminished in brief spells with Stockport County and Brighton & Hove Albion, before he featured for non-league sides Dover Athletic, Aldershot Town and North Leigh. He retired from playing in 2010, having helped North Leigh to win promotion from the Hellenic Football League in 2007–08.

He worked as a coach at Oxford United from 2010 to 2020, and was appointed as manager of North Leigh in November 2022.

Playing career
Allen started his career with Oxford United, and made his debut under Brian Horton in the 1991–92 Second Division campaign; he played fourteen games, helping the "U's" to avoid relegation. He made 31 appearances in 1992–93, as Oxford finished mid-table in the newly re-branded First Division. New manager Denis Smith played Allen in 45 games in 1993–94, though neither player or manager could prevent Oxford suffering relegation into the third tier. He played 36 games in 1994–95, as United missed out on the play-offs by six points. He played 24 games in the club's promotion winning 1995–96 campaign. Allen scored a total of 17 goals in 181 appearances in all competitions. Whilst at Oxford, he was capped twice for England at under-21 level, with both appearances coming in the 1995 edition of the Toulon Tournament, in 2–0 defeats to eventual finalists Brazil and France.

He joined Frank Clark's Nottingham Forest on loan in February 1996, and made his Premier League debut on 2 March, in a 3–1 win over Sheffield Wednesday at Hillsborough. He scored his first top-flight goal a fortnight later, in a 1–1 draw with Middlesbrough at the Riverside Stadium, though would only make one further appearance in 1995–96. Allen moved to the City Ground permanently in the summer for a £400,000 fee. He then played 23 Premiership games in 1996–97, and also scored against Ipswich Town in the FA Cup; Forest were relegated at the end of the season. He appeared in just one league game under new manager Dave Bassett in Forest's 1997–98 promotion campaign, though he appeared in both legs of the 10–1 demolition of Doncaster Rovers in the League Cup, finding himself on the scoresheet for the 8–0 triumph at Belle Vue.

Allen joined Lennie Lawrence's Luton Town on loan in November 1997, and played seventeen games, scoring once against Bristol Rovers at Kenilworth Road. He did not feature for Forest once his three-month loan spell at Luton ended. Allen did not feature under either Bassett or Ron Atkinson in 1998–99, and was instead loaned out to Cardiff City in October. He appeared five times for Frank Burrows's Third Division promotion winning side. In March, he was transferred to Brian Horton's Port Vale, playing five games, scoring once against Stockport County; the "Valiants" avoided relegation on goals scored.

Allen signed with Andy Kilner's Stockport County in October 1999, and played sixteen games in 1999–2000. He then signed with Brighton & Hove Albion, but did not make a senior appearance. He spent summer 2001 on trial at Cambridge United, but was not offered a contract. He signed with Dover Athletic in October 2001, after manager Gary Bellamy said that he "destroyed the opposition" in the three games he played on trial. He played 17 Conference games in 2001–02, as the "Whites" finished bottom of the table and were relegated into the Southern League.

He signed for North Leigh in 2006 and played with them until 2010. He scored four goals in a match against Wallingford on 24 April 2008, and scored thirty goals from forty games that season. The "Yellows" were promoted out of the Hellenic Football League into the Southern League Division One South & West in 2007–08.

Coaching career
Allen returned to Oxford United in June 2010, when he was appointed as youth team coach. He was credited as playing a key role in the development of a number of youth team players who made the step up into the Oxford United first team, including Max Crocombe, Tyrone Marsh, Callum O'Dowda, Josh Ashby, Sam Long and James Roberts. He was promoted to first team coach in July 2015, but left the club in October 2020 to "explore other opportunities which would allow a healthier work/family balance". He went on to coach the under-21s at Coventry City.

On 29 November 2022, Allen was appointed as manager of North Leigh, who were bottom of the Southern League Premier Division South.

Career statistics
Source:

Honours
Oxford United
Football League First Division second-place promotion: 1995–96

Nottingham Forest
Football League First Division: 1997–98

Cardiff City
Football League Third Division third-place promotion winner: 1998–99

North Leigh
Hellenic Football League promotion winner: 2007–08

References

1972 births
Living people
Footballers from Oxford
Black British sportsmen
English footballers
England under-21 international footballers
Association football midfielders
Oxford United F.C. players
Nottingham Forest F.C. players
Luton Town F.C. players
Cardiff City F.C. players
Port Vale F.C. players
Stockport County F.C. players
Brighton & Hove Albion F.C. players
Dover Athletic F.C. players
Aldershot Town F.C. players
North Leigh F.C. players
Premier League players
English Football League players
National League (English football) players
Southern Football League players
Association football coaches
Oxford United F.C. non-playing staff
Coventry City F.C. non-playing staff
English football managers
North Leigh F.C. managers
Southern Football League managers